Meriem Bennani (born 1988) is a Moroccan artist currently based in New York.

Biography 

Bennani was born and raised in Rabat, Morocco. She earned a BFA from The Cooper Union in 2012, and an MFA from the École Nationale Supérieure des Arts Décoratifs in Paris.

Work 

Bennani works in video, sculpture, multimedia installation, drawing, and Instagram. She is known for her playful and humorous use of digital technologies such as 3D animation, projection mapping, and motion capture. She often publishes her work on social media such as Instagram and Snapchat, having over thirty-seven-thousand followers on the latter as of July 2020.

Bennani was one of the four artists featured in the 2019 Whitney Biennial who formally requested that their work be removed via a collective letter which was also published on Artforum.

She was the winner of the 2019 Eye Art & Film Prize 

In 2020 Bennani collaborated with Orian Barki on a series entitled 2 Lizards. The subject of the series is life in New York City during the COVID-19 pandemic. The 8 short videos are now in the collection of the Museum of Modern Art and the Whitney Museum of American Art.

Gradual Kingdom 
Bennani's exhibition, Gradual Kingdom, which was featured at SIGNAL gallery in 2015, incorporated video, drawing and sculpture. This exhibit addresses the relationship between her hometown, Rabat, Morocco, and global networks of exchange. Bennani incorporates sand into her sculptural installation to highlight the extraction of sand from her home region to build artificial islands in the Middle East and to replenish eroding luxury beaches.

Siham and Hafida 
Bennani's 2017 exhibition Siham and Hafida was a multi-channel video installation at The Kitchen in which Benanni explores the generational conflict between two Moroccan chikha singers, combining the artist's own footage with digital manipulations and animations.

Fly 
Bennani's 2016 video installation FLY at MoMA PS1 featured a layered choreography of projections which evoked the kaleidoscopic eye of the titular animal. An animated fly acts as a diegetic guide through footage shot in Bennani's hometown of Rabat, Morocco. The fly moves us through fragmented scenes of markets, a wedding, and interviews with relatives, stopping occasionally to sing a distorted version of Rihanna's “Kiss It Better.”

Fardaous Funjab 
Fardaous Funjab is an itinerant fake reality TV show centered around a fictitious hijab designer who creates campy and absurdist designs such as a hijab made of a tennis ball basket or a multi-tiered wedding cake. The project explores the cultural significance of the headscarf, selecting events and holidays that pay homage to both Muslim and American cultures as inspiration for her hijab designs.

References

Living people
21st-century Moroccan artists
1988 births
Cooper Union alumni
Moroccan expatriates in the United States
People from Rabat
Moroccan women artists
21st-century women artists
École nationale supérieure des arts décoratifs alumni